This is a list of head football coaches for the Catholic University Cardinals football team, which represents the Catholic University of America in college football. Catholic joined the NCAA Division III's New England Women's and Men's Athletic Conference (NEWMAC) as a football-only member in 2017, having played the previous 18 seasons (1999–2016) in the Old Dominion Athletic Conference (ODAC).

Coaching records

References

Lists of college football head coaches

Washington, D.C., sport-related lists